The Albanian Democratic Union Party (PBDSH) is a political party in Albania led by Ylber Valteri.  The party was founded in 1993. In the 2009 parliamentary elections the party received 0.08%.

References

External links
Official Facebook page

Political parties in Albania
1993 establishments in Albania
Political parties established in 1993